The 2022 Aragon motorcycle Grand Prix (officially known as the Gran Premio Animoca Brands de Aragón) was the fifteenth round of the 2022 Grand Prix motorcycle racing season. It was held at the MotorLand Aragón in Alcañiz on 18 September 2022.

In the MotoGP class, Enea Bastianini's win helped Ducati secure its third consecutive and fourth overall Constructors' Championship.

Background

Riders' entries 
In the MotoGP class, Marc Márquez returns to the track with the Honda of the Repsol Honda Team, who had stopped after the Italian Grand Prix and had undergone a fourth surgery on his right humerus and was replaced by Stefan Bradl. Cal Crutchlow, Yamaha test rider, replaces Andrea Dovizioso in the WithU Yamaha RNF MotoGP Team starting from this race, which has decided to retire from his racing career. Joan Mir returned to Suzuki after missing the Misano race due to an ankle injury sustained in the Austrian Grand Prix and replaced by Kazuki Watanabe. In the Moto2 class, the Japanese Taiga Hada continues to replace Gabriel Rodrigo in the Pertamina Mandalika SAG Team, and the Australian Senna Agius continues to replace Sam Lowes in the Elf Marc VDS Racing Team. In the Moto3 class, in addition to the confirmation of Nicola Carraro as a replacement for Matteo Bertelle on the KTM of the QJmotor Avintia Racing Team, there are two wildcards to report: María Herrera (who raced in the 2022 MotoE World Cup) with the KTM of the Angeluss MTA Team: the Spaniard returns to racing in the category five years after the last race, the 2017 Valencian Community Grand Prix; the Italian Alessandro Morosi rides with the KTM of the MT Helmets - MSI team.

MotoGP Championship standings before the race 
The fourth consecutive success obtained at Misano (the sixth of the season) allows Francesco Bagnaia to overtake Aleix Espargaró in second place in the riders' classification (181 vs. 178 points) and to further reduce the delay from the leader Fabio Quartararo (211 points). Fourth is Enea Bastianini with 138 points, who overtakes Johann Zarco (125 points) and Jack Miller (123 points). In the constructors' classification, Ducati leads widely with 321 points, 110 points ahead of Yamaha; followed by Aprilia (201 points), KTM (148 points), Suzuki (127 points) and Honda (96 points). In the team standings, Ducati Lenovo Team is first with 304 points, plus 25 on Aprilia Racing, plus 67 on Monster Energy Yamaha MotoGP, plus 85 on Prima Pramac Racing and plus 99 on Red Bull KTM Factory Racing.

Moto2 Championship standings before the race 
Augusto Fernández returns to the top of the riders' standings with 198 points, overtaking Ai Ogura by four points. Arón Canet overtakes Celestino Vietti by one point in third place (157 vs 156 points); fifth is Tony Arbolino with 117 points. In the constructors' standings, Kalex, arithmetically champion (345 points), is no longer at full points thanks to the victory of Alonso López in the previous race with Boscoscuro (111 points), who returned to win four years after his last victory with Fabio Quartararo in the 2018 Italian Grand Prix, when it was called Speed Up. MV Agusta closes the standings, stopping at 5 points. In the team standings, Red Bull KTM Ajo overtakes Idemitsu Honda Team Asia in first place (296 vs 294 points). Third is Flexbox HP40 with 232 points, followed by GasGas Aspar Team and Elf Marc VDS Racing Team who have 173 and 168 points respectively.

Moto3 Championship standings before the race 
Izan Guevara overtakes his teammate Sergio García at the top of the riders' standings: the first has 204 points, with an advantage of 11 points over the latter. Dennis Foggia, winner in Misano, confirms himself third at 35 points behind Guevara; Jaume Masià and Deniz Öncü are fourth and fifth with 147 and 140 points respectively. The constructors' classification reads: Gas Gas 262 points, Honda 251 points, KTM 230 points, Husqvarna 174 points, CFMoto 103 points. In the team classification, Gaviota GasGas Aspar Team leads widely with 397 points, plus 104 on Leopard Racing; third is Red Bull KTM Ajo with 214 points, followed by Sterilgarda Husqvarna Max with 185 points and Red Bull KTM Tech3 with 169 points.

Free practice

MotoGP

Combinated Free Practice 1-2-3 
The top ten riders (written in bold) qualified in Q2.

Qualifying

MotoGP

Moto2

Moto3

Race

MotoGP

 Joan Mir withdrew from the event after FP3 due to effects of a broken ankle suffered at the Austrian Grand Prix.

Moto2

Moto3 

Alberto Surra suffered a fractured right hand in a crash during Free Practice 3 and withdrew from the event.

Championship standings after the race
Below are the standings for the top five riders, constructors, and teams after the round.

MotoGP

Riders' Championship standings

Constructors' Championship standings

Teams' Championship standings

Moto2

Riders' Championship standings

Constructors' Championship standings

Teams' Championship standings

Moto3

Riders' Championship standings

Constructors' Championship standings

Teams' Championship standings

References

External links

2022 MotoGP race reports
2022 in Spanish motorsport
2022
September 2022 sports events in Spain